Abhigyan Jha is an Indian film screenwriter, producer, director, writer and entrepreneur who has worked predominantly in Hindi film and television industry. He has written story for  film Krishna Cottage (2004), Phir Zindagi and TV show, Tum Bin Jaaoon Kahaan,  and made his directorial debut with Sacred Evil – A True Story (2006). He is the creator and director of Jay Hind!, exclusively made for the Internet. He also directed and produced the late-night talk show Movers & Shakers for Sony.

He is the co-founder of Undercover Utopia. He is also a co-founder of ProMytheUs, a machine learning talent discovery platform.

Career 
After completing the creative training program from the Advertising Agencies Association of India, Abhigyan started assisting to Anand Mahendroo. He published his first novel, November Rain in 1994, followed by his second novel, The Prayer. His novel, November Rain was transformed into a prime time TV series Tum Bin Jaaoon Kahaan, which was aired on Zee TV for over 300 episodes. In 1997, Jha worked as an assistant producer under Ismail Merchant on the international film GAACHH, starring Soumitra Chatterjee, Sharmila Tagore and Aparna Sen.  In 1997, Abhigyan Jha directed and produced the Sony Entertainment's popular late-night talk show, Movers & Shakers.

He wrote the story and screenplay of Ekta Kapoor's production, Krishna Cottage (2004) and has also written the film, Alvida, starring Milind Soman, Gul Panag and Waheeda Rahman. In 2006, he made his debut as a director with Sacred Evil – A True Story. He produced TV series, Kaali – Ek Agnipariksha, which was aired on Star Plus In 2009, Abhigyan Jha launched Jay Hind!, a standup comedy show exclusively for the Internet platform. It was the world's first full format TV show exclusively  made for the Internet. He is credited for pioneering the standup comedy genre in India on TV with Varun Grover, Aditi Mittal, Sorabh Pant, Gursimran Khamba and Sapan Verma.

Abhigyan was nominated for ITA Award for Best Director - Comedy at the Indian Television Academy Awards 2011 for Jay Hind!. Later, the show was aired on Colors TV under a new name, The Late Night Show in 2012.

In April 2014, Abhigyan Jha accused Vikas Bahl, the director of Queen for copying the film, Queen from his film, Phir Zindagi. However, Jha accepted the fact that while the scripts of the two films are different, but some major scenes from the film have been copied straight from Phir Zindagi.

Published works

Filmography

Television

Personal life 
He is married to Mrinal Jha and has a daughter. He is the son of Ramesh Rajhans, a theatre director and playwright.

References

External links 
 
 
 Undercover Productions & the END of broadcasting (as we know it)

Living people
Indian screenwriters
Indian writers
Indian businesspeople
Indian film producers
Indian non-fiction writers
1972 births